Santipur College, established in 1948, is a college in Santipur, in Nadia district, West Bengal, India. It offers undergraduate courses in arts and sciences. It is affiliated to  University of Kalyani.

History 
This college was established on 22 July 1948 by local educationists of Santipur and  under the guidance of the then Member of Parliament, Lok Sabha Pandit Laxmi Kanta Maitra. Santipur college started its functioning at the Kharjala Garden House of Mr. Atal Bihari Maitra and was initially affiliated to University of Calcutta. The journey that commenced in a two storied building initially with 48 students only. In the session 2014 - 2015 the college had 15 departments and catered to the needs of 4690 students. The college is now affiliated to University of Kalyani.

Departments

Science

Chemistry
Physics
Mathematics
Botany
Zoology
Computer Application

Arts and Commerce

Bengali
English
Sanskrit
History
Geography
Political Science
Philosophy
Economics
Commerce

Accreditation
Santipur College was awarded B+ grade by the National Assessment and Accreditation Council (NAAC). The college is recognized by the University Grants Commission (UGC).

News
Demonstration of students in front of the college against the non-issuance of mark sheet by the college on 31 August 2021.

See also

References

External links
Santipur College
University of Kalyani
University Grants Commission
National Assessment and Accreditation Council

Universities and colleges in Nadia district
Colleges affiliated to University of Kalyani
Shantipur
Educational institutions established in 1948
1948 establishments in West Bengal